The history of the alphabet goes back to the conwriting system used for Semitic languages in the Levant in the 2nd millennium BCE. Most or nearly all alphabetic scripts used throughout the world today ultimately go back to this Semitic proto-alphabet. Its first origins can be traced back to a Proto-Sinaitic script developed in Ancient Egypt to represent the language of Semitic-speaking workers and slaves in Egypt.  Unskilled in the complex hieroglyphic system used to write the Egyptian language, which required a large number of pictograms, they selected a small number of those commonly seen in their Egyptian surroundings to describe the sounds, as opposed to the semantic values, of their own Canaanite language. This script was partly influenced by the older Egyptian hieratic, a cursive script related to Egyptian hieroglyphs. The Semitic alphabet became the ancestor of multiple writing systems across the Middle East, Europe, northern Africa, and Pakistan, mainly through Ancient South Arabian, Phoenician, Paleo-Hebrew (closely related and initially virtually identical to the Phoenician alphabet or even derived from it) and later Aramaic (derived from the Phoenician alphabet), four closely related members of the Semitic family of scripts that were in use during the early first millennium BCE. 

Some modern authors distinguish between consonantal scripts of the Semitic type, called "abjads" since 1996, and "true alphabets" in the narrow sense, the distinguishing criterion being that true alphabets consistently assign letters to both consonants and vowels on an equal basis, while the symbols in a pure abjad stand only for consonants. (So-called impure abjads may use diacritics or a few symbols to represent vowels.) In this sense, then the first true alphabet would be the Greek alphabet, which was adapted from the Phoenician alphabet, but not all scholars and linguists think this is enough to strip away the original meaning of an alphabet to one with both vowels and consonants. Latin, the most widely used alphabet today, in turn derives from the Etruscan and Greek alphabets, themselves derived from Phoenician.

Predecessors 
Two scripts are well attested from before the end of the fourth millennium BCE: Mesopotamian cuneiform and Egyptian hieroglyphs.
Hieroglyphs were employed in three ways in Ancient Egyptian texts: as logograms (ideograms) that represent a word denoting an object visually depicted by the hieroglyph; more commonly as phonograms writing a sound or sequence of sounds; and as determinatives (which provide clues to meaning without directly writing sounds). Since vowels were mostly unwritten, the hieroglyphs which indicated a single consonant could have been used as a consonantal alphabet (or "abjad").  This was not done when writing the Egyptian language, but seems to have been a significant influence on the creation of the first alphabet (used to write a Semitic language). All subsequent alphabets around the world have either descended from this first Semitic alphabet, or have been inspired by one of its descendants (i.e. "stimulus diffusion"), with the possible exception of the Meroitic alphabet, a 3rd-century BCE adaptation of hieroglyphs in Nubia to the south of Egypt.  The Rongorongo script of Easter Island may also be an independently invented alphabet, but too little is known of it to be certain.

Consonantal alphabets

Semitic alphabet 
The Proto-Sinaitic script of Egypt has yet to be fully deciphered. However, it may be alphabetic and probably records the Canaanite language. The oldest examples are found as graffiti in the Wadi el Hol and date to perhaps 1850 BCE. The table below shows hypothetical prototypes of the Phoenician alphabet in Egyptian hieroglyphs. Several correspondences have been proposed with Proto-Sinaitic letters.

This Semitic script adapted Egyptian hieroglyphs to write consonantal values based on the first sound of the Semitic name for the object depicted by the hieroglyph (the "acrophonic principle"). So, for example, the hieroglyph per ("house" in Egyptian) was used to write the sound [b] in Semitic, because [b] was the first sound in the Semitic word for "house", bayt. The script was used only sporadically, and retained its pictographic nature, for half a millennium, until adopted for governmental use in Canaan. The first Canaanite states to make extensive use of the alphabet were the Phoenician city-states and so later stages of the Canaanite script are called Phoenician. The Phoenician cities were maritime states at the center of a vast trade network and soon the Phoenician alphabet spread throughout the Mediterranean.  Two variants of the Phoenician alphabet had major impacts on the history of writing: the Aramaic alphabet and the Greek alphabet.

Descendants of the Aramaic abjad 

The Phoenician and Aramaic alphabets, like their Egyptian prototype, represented only consonants, a system called an abjad. The Aramaic alphabet, which evolved from the Phoenician in the 7th century BCE, to become the official script of the Persian Empire, appears to be the ancestor of nearly all the modern alphabets of Asia except India:
The modern Hebrew alphabet started out as a local variant of Imperial Aramaic. (The original Hebrew alphabet has been retained by the Samaritans.)
The Arabic alphabet descended from Aramaic via the Nabataean alphabet of what is now southern Jordan.
The Syriac alphabet used after the third century CE evolved, through the Pahlavi scripts and Sogdian alphabet, into the alphabets of North Asia such as the Old Turkic alphabet (probably), the Old Uyghur alphabet, the Mongolian writing systems, and the Manchu alphabet.
The Georgian scripts are of uncertain provenance, but appear to be part of the Persian-Aramaic (or perhaps the Greek) family.

Alphabets with vowels

Greek Alphabet 
Adoption

By at least the 8th century BCE the Greeks borrowed the Phoenician alphabet and adapted it to their own language, creating in the process the first "true" alphabet, in which vowels were accorded equal status with consonants. According to Greek legends transmitted by Herodotus, the alphabet was brought from Phoenicia to Greece by Cadmos. The letters of the Greek alphabet are the same as those of the Phoenician alphabet, and both alphabets are arranged in the same order. However, whereas separate letters for vowels would have actually hindered the legibility of Egyptian, Phoenician, or Hebrew, their absence was problematic for Greek, where vowels played a much more important role. The Greeks used for vowels some of the Phoenician letters representing consonants which weren't used in Greek speech. All of the names of the letters of the Phoenician alphabet started with consonants, and these consonants were what the letters represented, something called the acrophonic principle.

However, several Phoenician consonants were absent in Greek, and thus several letter names came to be pronounced with initial vowels. Since the start of the name of a letter was expected to be the sound of the letter (the acrophonic principle), in Greek these letters came to be used for vowels. As this fortunate development only provided for five or six (depending on dialect) of the twelve Greek vowels, the Greeks eventually created digraphs and other modifications, such as ei, ou, and o (which became omega), or in some cases simply ignored the deficiency, as in long a, i, u.

Several varieties of the Greek alphabet developed. One, known as Western Greek or Chalcidian, was used west of Athens and in southern Italy. The other variation, known as Eastern Greek, was used in Asia Minor (also called Asian Greece i.e. present-day aegean Turkey). The Athenians ( 400 BCE) adopted that latter variation and eventually the rest of the Greek-speaking world followed. After first writing right to left, the Greeks eventually chose to write from left to right, unlike the Phoenicians who wrote from right to left.  Many Greek letters are similar to Phoenician, except the letter direction is reversed or changed, which can be the result of historical changes from right-to-left writing to boustrophedon to left-to-right writing.

Descendants

Greek is in turn the source of all the modern scripts of Europe. In the eastern Greek dialects, which did not have an /h/, eta stood for a vowel, and remains a vowel in modern Greek and all other alphabets derived from the eastern variants: Glagolitic, Cyrillic, Armenian, Gothic (which used both Greek and Roman letters), and perhaps Georgian.

Although this description presents the evolution of scripts in a linear fashion, this is a simplification. For example, the Manchu alphabet, descended from the abjads of West Asia, was also influenced by Korean hangul, which was either independent (the traditional view) or derived from the abugidas of South Asia. Georgian apparently derives from the Aramaic family, but was strongly influenced in its conception by Greek. A modified version of the Greek alphabet, using an additional half dozen demotic hieroglyphs, was used to write Coptic Egyptian. Then there is Cree syllabics (an abugida), which is a fusion of Devanagari and Pitman shorthand developed by the missionary James Evans.

Latin alphabet 

A tribe known as the Latins, who became the Romans, also lived in the Italian peninsula like the Western Greeks. From the Etruscans, a tribe living in the first millennium BCE in central Italy, and the Western Greeks, the Latins adopted writing in about the seventh century. In adopting writing from these two groups, the Latins dropped four characters from the Western Greek alphabet. They also adapted the Etruscan letter F, pronounced 'w,' giving it the 'f' sound, and the Etruscan S, which had three zigzag lines, was curved to make the modern S. To represent the G sound in Greek and the K sound in Etruscan, the Gamma was used. These changes produced the modern alphabet without the letters G, J, U, W, Y, and Z, as well as some other differences.

Over the few centuries after Alexander the Great conquered the Eastern Mediterranean and other areas in the third century BCE, the Romans began to borrow Greek words, so they had to adapt their alphabet again in order to write these words. From the Eastern Greek alphabet, they borrowed Y and Z, which were added to the end of the alphabet because the only time they were used was to write Greek words.

The Anglo-Saxons began using Roman letters to write Old English as they converted to Christianity, following Augustine of Canterbury's mission to Britain in the sixth century. Because the Runic wen, which was first used to represent the sound 'w' and looked like a p that is narrow and triangular, was easy to confuse with an actual p, the 'w' sound began to be written using a double u. Because the u at the time looked like a v, the double u looked like two v's, W was placed in the alphabet after V. U developed when people began to use the rounded U when they meant the vowel u and the pointed V when the meant the consonant V. J began as a variation of I, in which a long tail was added to the final I when there were several in a row. People began to use the J for the consonant and the I for the vowel by the fifteenth century, and it was fully accepted in the mid-seventeenth century.

Letter names and order 
The order of the letters of the alphabet is attested from the fourteenth century BCE in the town of Ugarit on Syria's northern coast. Tablets found there bear over one thousand cuneiform signs, but these signs are not Babylonian and there are only thirty distinct characters. About twelve of the tablets have the signs set out in alphabetic order. There are two orders found, one of which is nearly identical to the order used for Hebrew, Greek and Latin, and a second order very similar to that used for Ethiopian.

It is not known how many letters the Proto-Sinaitic alphabet had nor what their alphabetic order was. Among its descendants, the Ugaritic alphabet had 27 consonants, the South Arabian alphabets had 29, and the Phoenician alphabet 22. These scripts were arranged in two orders, an ABGDE order in Phoenician and an HMĦLQ order in the south; Ugaritic preserved both orders. Both sequences proved remarkably stable among the descendants of these scripts.

The letter names proved stable among the many descendants of Phoenician, including Samaritan, Aramaic, Syriac, Arabic, Hebrew, and Greek alphabet. However, they were largely abandoned in Tifinagh, Latin and Cyrillic. The letter sequence continued more or less intact into Latin, Armenian, Gothic, and Cyrillic, but was abandoned in Brahmi, Runic, and Arabic, although a traditional abjadi order remains or was re-introduced as an alternative in the latter.

The table is a schematic of the Phoenician alphabet and its descendants.

These 22 consonants account for the phonology of Northwest Semitic.
 → ḏāl;
 → ṯāʾ;
 → ḍād;
 → ġayn;
 → ẓāʾ;
 → ḫāʾ

Graphically independent alphabets 
One modern national alphabet that has not been graphically traced back to the Canaanite alphabet is the Maldivian script, which is unique in that, although it is clearly modeled after Arabic and perhaps other existing alphabets, it derives its letter forms from numerals. Another is the Korean Hangul, which was created independently in 1443. The Osmanya alphabet was devised for Somali in the 1920s by Osman Yusuf Kenadid, and the forms of its consonants appear to be complete innovations.

Among alphabets that are not used as national scripts today, a few are clearly independent in their letter forms. The Zhuyin phonetic alphabet and Japanese Kana both derive from Chinese characters. The Santali alphabet of eastern India appears to be based on traditional symbols such as "danger" and "meeting place", as well as pictographs invented by its creator. (The names of the Santali letters are related to the sound they represent through the acrophonic principle, as in the original alphabet, but it is the final consonant or vowel of the name that the letter represents:  le "swelling" represents e, while en "thresh grain" represents n.)

In early medieval Ireland, Ogham consisted of tally marks, and the monumental inscriptions of the Old Persian Empire were written in an essentially alphabetic cuneiform script whose letter forms seem to have been created for the occasion.

Alphabets in other media 
Changes to a new writing medium sometimes caused a break in graphical form, or make the relationship difficult to trace. It is not immediately obvious that the cuneiform Ugaritic alphabet derives from a prototypical Semitic abjad, for example, although this appears to be the case. And while manual alphabets are a direct continuation of the local written alphabet (both the British two-handed and the French/American one-handed alphabets retain the forms of the Latin alphabet, as the Indian manual alphabet does Devanagari, and the Korean does Hangul), Braille, semaphore, maritime signal flags, and the Morse codes are essentially arbitrary geometric forms. The shapes of the English Braille and semaphore letters, for example, are derived from the alphabetic order of the Latin alphabet, but not from the graphic forms of the letters themselves. Most modern forms of shorthand are also unrelated to the alphabet, generally transcribing sounds instead of letters.

See also 
 History of writing
 History of the Arabic alphabet
 History of the Latin script
 History of the Hebrew alphabet
 History of the Greek alphabet
 Runes
 List of creators of writing systems
 List of languages by first written accounts

References

Further reading 
 
 Peter T. Daniels, William Bright (eds.), 1996.  The World's Writing Systems, .
 David Diringer, History of the Alphabet, 1977, .
 Stephen R. Fischer, A History of Writing, 2005 Reaktion Books CN 136481
 
 Joel M. Hoffman, In the Beginning: A Short History of the Hebrew Language, 2004, .
 Robert K. Logan, The Alphabet Effect: The Impact of the Phonetic Alphabet on the Development of Western Civilization, New York: William Morrow and Company, Inc., 1986.
 
 Joseph Naveh, Early History of the Alphabet: an Introduction to West Semitic Epigraphy and Palaeography (Magnes Press – Hebrew University, Jerusalem, 1982)
 Barry B. Powell, Homer and Origin of the Greek Alphabet, Cambridge: Cambridge University Press, 1991.
 B.L. Ullman, "The Origin and Development of the Alphabet," American Journal of Archaeology 31, No. 3 (Jul., 1927): 311–328.

External links 
  Animated examples of how the English alphabet evolved by Robert Fradkin, University of Maryland
 The Greek alphabet on h2g2
 The Development of the Western Alphabet on h2g2
 Site by Micheal W. Palmer about the Greek alphabet
 "The Alphabet – its creation and development" on BBC Radio 4's In Our Time featuring Eleanor Robson, Alan Millard, Rosalind Thomas
 Book Jacket Early History of the Alphabet-Free cover-to-cover limited-time access through Judaic Digital Library

Alphabetic